Rupert Bergmann (born 14 June 1965) is an Austrian opera singer (bass-baritone). He works mainly on contemporary music theatre as well as operetta and musical.

In 2011 he presented Vogel Herzog Idiot, three "Mini-Mono-Operas" written for him by three different composers (in collaboration with Theater an der Wien).

Discography 

References

External links 
 
 Soloist at Theater an der Wien 2012, with photo (German)
 Biography at Sirene Operntheater Vienna (German)
 Rupert Bergmann at Operabase

Austrian operatic baritones
Operatic bass-baritones
Musicians from Graz
Living people
1965 births
20th-century Austrian  male opera singers
21st-century Austrian  male opera singers
University of Music and Performing Arts Graz alumni